Klaus Ertz (born 1945) is a German art historian specializing in the Brueghel family of artists and their workshop.

Ertz was born in Homburg and is best known for his catalogues raisonnés on Jan Brueghel the Elder, his son Jan II, his brother Pieter Brueghel the Younger, Josse de Momper, Marten van Cleve, Jan van Kessel, David Vinckboons, Josef van Bredal and Adriaen van Stalbemt. Ertz works as a private art consultant for various institutions in the art market. He and his wife Christa Nitze-Ertz own the art printing house Luca-Verlag in Lingen(Ems) that publishes books about Flemish paintings of the 16th and 17th century.

Works
 Pieter Breughel der Jüngere - Jan Brueghel der Ältere : flämische Malerei um 1600, Tradition und Fortschritt, by Ertz, Klaus, 1997
 Jan Breughel der Jüngere (1601-1678) : die Gemälde mit kritischem Œuvrekatalog, by Ertz, Klaus, 1985
 Jan Brueghel der Ältere (1568-1625) : d. Gemälde : mit krit. Oeuvrekatalog, by Ertz, Klaus, 1979
 Fälschung und Forschung : Ausstellung Museum Folkwang Essen, Oktober 1976-Januar 1977 : Skulpturengalerie, Staatl. Museen Preuss. Kulturbesitz Berlin, Januar-März 1977, by Ertz, Klaus, 1977
 Jan Brueghel the elder : a loan exhibition of paintings, 21 June-20 July 1979., by Brod Gallery (London, England), 1979
 Josse de Momper der Jüngere, 1564-1635 : die Gemälde mit kritischem Oeuvre-katalog = Josse de Momper the Younger : the paintings with critical catalogue raisonné ; with English language summary, by Ertz, Klaus, 1986
 Jan Brueghel der Ältere (1568-1625) : kritischer Katalog der Gemälde, by Ertz, Klaus, 2008
 Pieter Brueghel der Jüngere (1564-1637/38) : die Gemälde mit kritischem Œuvrekatalog, by Ertz, Klaus, 1988
 Jan Brueghel der Ältere (1568-1625), by Ertz, Klaus, 1981
 Marten van Cleve 1524-1581 : Kritischer Katalog der Gemälde und Zeichnungen, by Ertz, Klaus, 2014
 Josef van Bredael 1688-1739 : die Gemälde ; mit kritischem Œuvrekatalog, by Ertz, Klaus, 2006
 Jan van Kessel der Ältere 1626-1679 ; Jan van Kessel der Jüngere 1654-1708 ; Jan van Kessel der 'Andere' ca. 1620 - ca. 1661 : kritische Kataloge der Gemälde, by Ertz, Klaus, 2012
 Die Brueghel Familie = The Brueghel family, by Ertz, Klaus, 2015
 Paysages et saisons : aspects de l'art néerlandais du 17ème siècle, by Ertz, Klaus, 1987
 The Brueghel family of painters and further masters from the Golden Age of Netherlandish painting, by Ertz, Klaus, 1986
 Landscapes and saisons : aspects of Netherlands art in the seventeenth century, by Ertz, Klaus, 1987
 Jan Brueghel II (1601-1678) : zwei unbekannte Gemälde in russischen Sammlungen, kunstwissenschaftlich ins Spätwerk eingeordnet, by Ertz, Klaus, 2014
 17th century Netherlands painting : Galerie d'art St Honoré exhibition octobre 1985, by Ertz, Klaus, 1985
 David Vinckboons, 1576-1632 : Monographie mit kritischem Katalog der Zeichnungen und Gemälde, by Ertz, Klaus, 2016
 Blumen, Allegorien, Historie, Genre, Gemäldeskizzen : Kat. 420 - 584, by Ertz, Klaus, 2010
 Jan Brueghel d. Ä. als Mitarbeiter : Kat. 585 - 810 ; Addendum Kat. Add. 1 - 30, by Ertz, Klaus, 2010
 Niederländische Malerei des 17. Jahrhunderts, by Ertz, Klaus, 1985

References

 works by Klaus Ertz on WorldCat
 works by Klaus Ertz in RKD
 works by Klaus Ertz in collaborative research website "janbrueghel.net"

1945 births
Living people
People from Homburg, Saarland
German art historians